This is a list of diplomatic missions in Japan.  At present, the capital city of Tokyo hosts 154 embassies. A few other countries are accredited through their embassies in Beijing or elsewhere. This listing excludes honorary consulates.

Embassies in Tokyo 

This is a list of the 153 resident embassies in Tokyo .

Representative Offices in Tokyo

 (Spain) - Delegation
 (Delegation) 
 (Hong Kong Economic and Trade Office, Tokyo)
 (Chongryon) 
 (Permanent General Mission)
 (Canada) - Quebec Government Office
 (Taipei Economic and Cultural Representative Office in Japan)

Consulates General/Consulates

Fukuoka

 (Fukuoka Branch, Taipei Economic and Cultural Office in Osaka)

 (Consulate)

Hamamatsu

Hiroshima

Kobe

Kyoto

Nagasaki

Nagoya

 (Consulate)

 (Consulate)

Naha
 (Naha Branch, Taipei Economic and Cultural Office in Japan)

Niigata

Osaka

 (Consulate)

 (Consulate)
 (Taipei Economic and Cultural Office in Osaka)

Sapporo

 (Sapporo Branch, Taipei Economic and Cultural Representative Office in Japan)

Sendai

Tokyo

Yokohama

 (Yokohama Branch, Taipei Economic and Cultural Representative Office in Japan)

Accredited non-resident embassies

Resident in Beijing, China

Other Resident Locations

 (Nassau)
 (Bridgetown)
 (Taipei)
 (New Delhi)
 (Roseau)
 (Kuala Lumpur)
 (New York City)
 (Canberra)
 (Taipei)
 (Taipei)
 (New Delhi)

Closed missions

See also
Foreign relations of Japan
List of diplomatic missions of Japan
Visa requirements for Japanese citizens

Notes

References

External links
List of Embassies, Consulates and International Organizations in Japan

Diplomatic missions in Japan
Miss
Japan